The Judo competition at the 1997 East Asian Games was contested in eight weight classes, eight each for men and women.

This competition was held at Gym of Dong-A University, from 15 to 18 May.

Medal overview

Men's events

Women's events

Medals table 

1997
1997 East Asian Games
1997
Asian Games, East
Asian Games, East 1997